Christian Onyia is an Anglican bishop in Nigeria: he is the current Bishop of Nike.

He was consecrated Bishop of Nike in April 2019 at St David's Anglican Cathedral Church, Ijomu, Akure, by the Primate of All Nigeria, Nicholas Okoh.

Notes

Living people
Anglican bishops of Nike
21st-century Anglican bishops in Nigeria
Year of birth missing (living people)